Floretta and Patapon (Italian:Florette e Patapon) may refer to:

 Floretta and Patapon (1913 film), an Italian silent film
 Floretta and Patapon (1927 film), an Italian silent film